The 11th Air Defense Division (Serbo-Croatian: 11. divizija protivvazdušne odbrane/ 11. дивизија противваздушне одбране) was an air defense division established in 1964 1st Air Defense Zone (Serbo-Croatian: 1. zona protivvazdušne odbrane / 1. зона противваздушне одбране).

History
The 1st Air Defense Zone was formed in 1964, and it was reorganized into 11th Air Defense Division on July 25, 1966. The divisions command was at Belgrade - Banjica. Its task was aerial defense of eastern part of the airspace of Yugoslavia. It has consisted from five regiments, two fighter aviation regiments, two rocket air defense regiments and one air reconnaissance regiment, and other smaller units. It was disbanded on February 28, 1986, when its command was reorganized into command of 1st Corps of Air Force and Air Defense.

Assignments
Command of Yugoslav Air Force (1964-1978)
1st Aviation Corps (1978–1986)

Previous designations
1st Air Defense Zone (1964-1966)
11th Air Defense Division (1966-1986)

Organization
83rd Fighter Aviation Regiment
204th Fighter Aviation Regiment
250th Air Defense Missile Regiment
450th Air Defense Missile Regiment
1st Air Reconnaissance Regiment
210th Signal Battalion

Commanding officers

References

Divisions of Yugoslav Air Force
Military units and formations established in 1964
Military units and formations disestablished in 1986